Lophiophora is a genus of moths of the family Erebidae. The genus was erected by Felix Bryk in 1915.

Species
Lophiophora fulminans Bryk, 1915
Lophiophora latefasciata Gaede, 1940
Lophiophora purpurata (Hampson, 1926)

References

Bryk, F. (1915). "Neue exotische, insbesondere aethiopische Schmetterlinge". Archiv für Naturgeschichte. 81 (A4) (4): 1–16, pl. 1. 

Calpinae
Moth genera